Peter Westergaard's tonal theory is the theory of tonal music developed by Peter Westergaard and outlined in Westergaard's 1975 book An Introduction to Tonal Theory (hereafter referred to as ITT). Based on ideas of Heinrich Schenker, Westergaard's theory is notable for:
explicit treatment of the relationship between rhythmic structures and pitch structures in tonal music
elimination of "harmony" as a conceptually independent element of musical structure.

Methodological foundations

In keeping with Westergaard's characteristic "concern with fundamental methodological questions", ITT begins with a discussion of what it is that a theory of tonal music consists of. The conclusion reached is that it is a "logical framework in terms of which we understand tonal music"–the operative words being "we understand". Westergaard is thus seeking a theory about a certain kind of cognition, as opposed to one dealing with acoustics or neurophysiology. The argument he gives for defining the domain of inquiry in this way is essentially the following: on the one hand, the acoustics of music are already well understood, and in any case acoustical theories are of limited use in addressing the psychological aspects of the musical experience; on the other hand, while neuroscience may eventually be capable of addressing these latter aspects, it is not currently equipped to do so—a situation which is unlikely to change in the near future. Consequently, our best strategy is to address the psychological questions directly, more or less at the level of introspection.

Such an approach, however, immediately raises the problem of developing a metalanguage for discussing tonal music: how do we accurately describe "what we hear"? Reasoning that the process of solving this problem will itself lead inevitably to substantive insights into how music is actually heard, Westergaard takes the construction of a metalanguage for tonal music as his task for the main part of the book.

Outline of the theory 
Music is conceived of as consisting of discrete atoms called notes. By definition, these are (conceptual) units of sound that possess the following five attributes: pitch, onset time, duration, loudness, and timbre. The core of Westergaardian theory consists of the following two claims about notes:
Starting from a specific type of primitive structure (a diatonic collection with an associated "tonic" triad; see below), we can generate all the notes of any tonal piece by successive application of a small set of operations.
The successive stages in the generation process show how we understand the notes in terms of each other.

Generative operations
Every note is associated both with a particular pitch and a particular time-span (the interval of time between the moment when the note begins and the moment when it ends). Westergaardian operations on notes may be described as composite in nature: they consist of operations on time-spans, onto which operations on pitches are superimposed. (One can think of the time-span operations as accommodating the pitch operations.)

In accordance with the second fundamental claim of Westergaard's theory (see above), applying the operations to given notes should produce other notes that are understood by the listener as being derived from the given notes. One is thus obliged to deal with the question of structural ambiguity: by what means can the composer ensure that the listener understands the particular subordination relations that were intended? Describing potentially ambiguous situations, and the means of resolving them, is one of the major themes of Westergaardian theory, and this preoccupation is evident throughout ITT.

Operations on rhythm

Segmentation
A time-span may be divided into smaller time-spans:

Delay
The onset time of a note may be delayed to a later time-point:

Anticipation
A note may be anticipated by another note whose time-span is conceptually subordinate to that of the original note:

Operations on pitch

Rearticulation
A note in a line may be split into a sequence of successive notes such that:
the durations of all of the notes together equal the duration of the original note;
all of the notes have the same pitch as the original note; and
the first note begins at the same moment in time the original note began.

This process (along with its result) is called rearticulation. Although repeated notes may result from an anticipatory structure as well as one derived by segmentation, Westergaard does not use the term "anticipatory rearticulation", preferring instead to simply call such structures "anticipations".

Neighbors

A neighbor structure is constructed from a rearticulation by:
dividing the time-span of the first note into two segments, and
inserting, in the second segment, a note whose pitch is an adjacent member of the appropriate diatonic collection (while leaving a note of the original pitch to occupy the first segment).

The new note is referred to as a neighbor of the original two. Unlike the ordinary use of the word "neighbor", this relationship is not reciprocal.

Incomplete neighbors may be used to anticipate or delay a note:

Borrowing/arpeggiation

A note may be borrowed from another (conceptual) line:

The borrowed note need only be a member of the same pitch class as the source; it does not have to be in the same octave:

Borrowings may of course be anticipatory:

N.B.: It is largely this operation which replaces harmony in Westergaardian theory.

Notes

References 

Sources

Further reading
Schmalfeldt, Janet. "Coming to Terms: Speaking of Phrase, Cadence, and Form." In Theory Only 13:1-4 [September 1997] p. 95-115

Schenkerian analysis